Thomas Winnington  (31 December 169623 April 1746), of Stanford Court, Stanford on Teme. Worcestershire, was an English Whig politician who sat in the House of Commons from 1726 to 1746.

Biography
Winnington was the second, but eldest surviving, son of Salwey Winnington of Stanford Court, Member of Parliament for Bewdley, and his wife Anne Foley, daughter of Thomas Foley, MP, of Witley Court, Worcestershire. He was grandson of Sir Francis Winnington, who had been Solicitor General in the 1670s. He was educated at Westminster School and matriculated at Christ Church, Oxford in 1713. He was admitted to Middle Temple in 1714.

Winnington entered Parliament at a by-election on 31 January 1726 as a Tory Member of Parliament for Droitwich, but very soon after became a Whig and supported the Administration. He was returned unopposed again in 1727 and 1734. At the 1741 returned for Droitwich and also  elected in a contest for Worcester (a more prestigious constituency), and he chose to sit for Worcester in what turned out to be his last Parliament.

A supporter of the Prime Minister Robert Walpole, Winnington was made a Lord of the Admiralty in 1730, and served as a Lord of the Treasury from 1736 to 1742; in 1741 he was made a Privy Counsellor and became Cofferer of the Household. When Henry Pelham became Prime Minister in 1743, he appointed Winnington Paymaster General of the Forces, the post he himself had held in the previous administration (although unlike Pelham, Winnington was not accorded a seat in the Cabinet); he held this post for the remaining two-and-a-half years of his life.

Winnington purchased the shares of the elder sisters in the family estate of Stanford (which his grandfather Sir Francis had acquired for the family through his second marriage), and in 1674 he bought the leasehold interest under the crown of the manor of Bewdley.

Family
In 1719, Winnington married Love Reade, daughter of Sir James Reade, Bt. of Brocket Hall, Hertfordshire. They had no children. Winnington became the lover of Etheldreda Townshend in 1742 and it was said that she was the one in charge. The Stanford Court estate subsequently passed to his cousin who became Sir Edward Winnington, 1st Baronet. The Elizabethan mansion of Stanford Court was burnt on 5 December 1882, and the valuable books and manuscripts in the old library were destroyed. Stanford Court was rebuilt and remained the family seat until sold by Sir Francis Winnington, 6th Baronet in 1949.

Notes

References
 Concise Dictionary of National Biography

 
 Winnington genealogy

External links
 Portrait of Winnington at the National Portrait Gallery

1696 births
1746 deaths
Alumni of Christ Church, Oxford
Lords of the Admiralty
Members of the Middle Temple
Members of the Parliament of Great Britain for Worcester
Members of the Privy Council of Great Britain
People educated at Westminster School, London
British MPs 1722–1727
British MPs 1727–1734
British MPs 1734–1741
British MPs 1741–1747
People from Malvern Hills District
Politicians from Worcestershire